M. Padmakumar is an Indian film director working in Malayalam cinema. He began his career working as an assistant director to a number of leading directors and later became an independent director through Ammakilikkoodu in 2003. His best known works include Vaasthavam (2006), Shikkar (2010), Jalam (2015), Joseph (2018) and Mamangam (2019).

Filmography
Films

Director

Television

Assistant director

References

External links
 

20th-century Indian film directors
Living people
Place of birth missing (living people)
Year of birth missing (living people)
Malayalam film directors
21st-century Indian film directors